Sarcheleh Varegah, also simply Sar Cheleh or Sarcheleh or Sar Chelleh, may refer to:
Sarcheleh Varegah-e Olya
Sarcheleh Varegah-e Sofla